Nanjing Zhonghua High School, was founded by Dr. William E. Macklin, a British missionary doctor, in 1899.

History
The school's name was Christian Middle School when it was founded. Dr. William E. Macklin founded Gulou Hospital in Nanjing as well. Nanjing Zhonghua High School had been a school for women and changed its name for several times. In 1929, the school was named as Yuqun (育群) High School. Then it was renamed as Nanjing No.1 Girls High School in 1951. In 1968, under the influence of the Chinese Culture Revolution movement, the school was renamed as Nanjing Dongfanghong (东方红) High School. It was officially named as Nanjing Zhonghua High School in 1983. Throughout the history, Nanjing Zhonghua High School has been an outstanding high school in the city of Nanjing, the capital of Jiangsu province, and once the capital of the Republic of China.

Nanjing Zhonghua High School has always been recognized as one of the four best high schools in Nanjing, along with High School Affiliated to Nanjing Normal University, Nanjing Jinling High School and Nanjing No.1 High School.

Hexi campus
The campus on 369 Zhonghua Road, Nanjing, is now the campus for Nanjing Zhonghua Middle School. The high school section moved to 208 Xinglong Avenue in Hexi. Hexi campus is much larger than the old one and provides better facilities with 11 buildings including 60 classrooms and dorms that can host about 2,000 students. It is also close to Olympic Stadium station of Subway line 1 and Lüboyuan station of Subway Line 10. Hexi campus opened in fall 2011, though it lacked the tradition and culture of Zhonghua High School in the points of view of some students and parents.

High schools in Nanjing